Blackett is a surname of English derivation.

Blackett may also refer to:

 Blackett, New South Wales, Australia
 Blackett (crater), a lunar impact crater
 Blacket, Edinburgh a suburb in the south of Edinburgh, Scotland